John F. Harris is an American political journalist and the co-founder of Politico, an Arlington, Virginia-based political news organization. With former partner Jim VandeHei, Harris founded Politico on January 23, 2007, and served as editor-in-chief until 2019. Harris is the author of a book on Bill Clinton called The Survivor, and the co-author of The Way to Win: Clinton, Bush, Rove and How to Take the White House in 2008, with Mark Halperin.

Early life and education
Harris grew up in Pittsford, New York, where he attended Pittsford Sutherland High School. He graduated from Carleton College in 1985, where he studied American history.

Career 
After graduating from college, Harris worked for The Washington Post for 21 years, having started as an intern. In 1990, he was transferred to the Posts Richmond bureau, covering Virginia politics during Douglas Wilder's governorship. He covered the Clinton White House from 1995 to 2001. In 2003, he was a guest scholar at the Brookings Institution. He became the Posts National Politics Editor in June 2005. Harris began "having conversations" in 2006 with fellow Post journalist Jim VandeHei about creating "a new publication about politics from the ground up". Those conversations led to the launch of Politico in 2007 under the Allbritton Communications banner.

Personal life 
Harris is married to Ann O'Hanlon, and lives with their three children, Liza, Griffin, and Nikki, in Alexandria, Virginia.

Works
 Mark Halperin and John F. Harris, The Way to Win: Taking the White House in 2008, Random House, October 2006, 
 John F. Harris, The Survivor: Bill Clinton in the White House, Random House, May 2005, (Random House Trade Paperbacks, October 2006)

References

External links 
 John F. Harris at Politico
 Stanley Kutler: Review of John F. Harris's The Survivor
 

1960s births
21st-century American newspaper editors
American political journalists
Carleton College alumni
Living people
Politicians from Rochester, New York
Journalists from New York (state)
Politico people
American male journalists
20th-century American journalists
20th-century American male writers
21st-century American non-fiction writers
21st-century American male writers
American male non-fiction writers